Sadiki College, also known as Collège Sadiki ("El-Sadqiya High School"), is a lycée (high school) in Tunis, Tunisia. It was established in 1875. Associations formed by its alumni played a major role in the early constitutionalist movement in the country.

Noted alumni include ex-President Habib Bourguiba, politicians Mohamed Mzali, Mustapha Ben Jafar and Azzedine Guellouz. Another alumnus was the creative writer Mahmoud Messadi.

Sadiki historically has provided a bicultural, bilingual education. Many of the Tunisian elites, including Bourguiba, graduated from this school. These elites filled the positions of top responsibility of the Destour party. Charles A. Micaud of The Western Political Quarterly said "[i]ts realistic strategy of struggle against colonialism became convincing even to Zitūna students, many of whom came to form the medium and lower cadres of the party." The graduates of Sadiki placed a bilingual education system in Tunisia after its independence.

History
Khayr al-Diyn Pacha al-Tunisi, a reformer, had founded the school in 1875. On 25 June 1958 President of Tunisia Habib Bourguiba delivered a speech at the school, declaring that in secondary schools, all subjects will eventually be taught in Arabic instead of French throughout Tunisia.

See also

 :Category:Alumni of Sadiki College

References
 Micaud, Charles A. "Bilingualism in North Africa: Cultural and Sociopolitical Implications." The Western Political Quarterly. March 1974. Volume 27, Issue 1. p. 92-103.  Available on Jstor

Notes

External links 

 
Educational institutions established in 1875
Schools in Tunis
1875 establishments in Africa
1875 establishments in the Ottoman Empire
19th-century establishments in Tunisia